11,000 Clicks is a DVD release from the musical group Moloko, and their final release other than the compilation album Catalogue. It was recorded at Brixton Academy in London and also contains a documentary titled "Ed's Film" filmed by Eddie Stevens which contains footage shot by the band both backstage and on location.

Track listing
 "Familiar Feeling"
 "I Want You"
 "Absent Minded Friends"
 "Day for Night"
 "Come On"
 "Fun for Me"
 "Where Is the What If the What Is in Why?"
 "Cannot Contain This"
 "Pure Pleasure Seeker"
 "The Time Is Now"
 "Statues"
 "100%"
 "Forever More"
 "Sing It Back"
 "Being Is Bewildering"
 "Blow X Blow"
 "Indigo"

References
IMDB- Moloko - 11,000 Clicks
The New York Times Movies

Moloko live albums
2004 live albums
2004 video albums
Live video albums
Sanctuary Records live albums
Sanctuary Records video albums
Moloko video albums